Atkinson Road Bridge, also known as County Bridge 305, is a historic stone arch bridge located in Solebury Township, Bucks County, Pennsylvania. It spans Pidcock's Creek.  It has three spans, each approximately 20 feet long, and was constructed in 1873.  It is of random rubble construction and built of native fieldstone.

It was listed on the National Register of Historic Places in 2002.

References 
 

Road bridges on the National Register of Historic Places in Pennsylvania
Bridges completed in 1873
Bridges in Bucks County, Pennsylvania
National Register of Historic Places in Bucks County, Pennsylvania
Stone arch bridges in the United States